Hanna Stanislavivna Homonai (born 29 May 1979) is a Ukrainian TV news anchor. She was born in Kyiv, in the Ukrainian SSR of the Soviet Union (in present-day Ukraine).

Career in Journalism

 1999—2004 — Noviy Kanal, correspondent.
 2004 — 5th Channel, news anchor.
 2005—2007 — K1, news anchor.
 Since 2007 — Inter, news anchor.
 2007-08 — co-host of 'The Great Ukrainians' TV-show.
After the return of her husband Andriy Shevchenko from his diplomatic mission in Canada Hanna resumed her career as a tv presenter on the Rada TV channel.

Education

In 2003 she received her master's degree from the Institute of Journalism at Kyiv Taras Shevchenko University.

In 1996-97 she studied at Augustine Cournot Lyceum (Gray, France).

In 1996 she graduated from Kyiv Secondary School #251.

Personal life

Homonai is married to Andriy Shevchenko, a journalist, politician, and diplomat, with whom she has a daughter Marichka.

References

 Profile at inter.ua 

1979 births
Living people
Taras Shevchenko National University of Kyiv alumni
Television presenters from Kyiv
5 Kanal people